The End Tour was the final concert tour for the English heavy metal band Black Sabbath, featuring founding members Ozzy Osbourne, Tony Iommi and Geezer Butler. They performed on the tour with session drummer Tommy Clufetos filling in for the band's original drummer, Bill Ward, along with keyboardist and guitarist Adam Wakeman. The tour concluded Sabbath's over-four-decade career, and was accompanied by the release of an exclusive EP, The End, which contains leftover tracks from the sessions for the band's final studio album, 13, as well as live tracks from their 2012–2014 reunion tour.

The End Tour consisted of 81 shows across North America, Europe, Oceania, and South America, and grossed a total of $84.8 million. The final concert took place on 4 February 2017, in the band's home city of Birmingham, England. The final show was documented as a concert film, Black Sabbath: The End of the End, and the songs from the final show were released as a live album, The End: Live in Birmingham.

Overview

Background

Initial dates were announced in a video posted on the band's YouTube channel on 3 September 2015 with more dates announced in October 2015. As with the previous tour, Tommy Clufetos filled in for original drummer Bill Ward, due to the latter's departure and animosity towards singer Ozzy Osbourne. An eight-track EP, entitled The End, was released to coincide with this tour and was only available at shows. Rival Sons were the sole support act for all of Black Sabbath's headlining shows. Five Finger Death Punch originally planned to join the Oceanic leg of the tour, but backed out following the hospitalization of their frontman Ivan Moody. Osbourne said of the farewell tour: "This is it, it's definitely run its course"."

The tour concluded on 4 February 2017 with the final two gigs being played in the band's native Birmingham. The last show was streamed live on the band's Facebook page. Prior to the gig, Ozzy discussed his emotions he was feeling, suggesting he would cry after the farewell. Osbourne was adamant this is the end, but intends to carry on with solo work, having already returned following a 1992 'final' solo tour. Iommi confirmed no more world tours, but remains open to a new album or one-off show. Iommi had been diagnosed with lymphoma in 2012, and the toll of touring on his health was the main reason to end touring. Osbourne had intended to say something to the crowd but did not prepare a speech. He closed the show with a simple statement to the crowd "Thank you, goodnight, thank you so much."

Setlist
The following setlist was performed at the Rogers Arena in Vancouver, Canada, and is not intended to represent all the shows on the tour.
"Black Sabbath"
"Fairies Wear Boots"
"After Forever"
"Into the Void"
"Snowblind"
"War Pigs"
"Behind the Wall of Sleep"
"Bassically" (Geezer Butler bass solo)
"N.I.B."
"Hand of Doom"
"Rat Salad"
Tommy Clufetos drum solo
"Iron Man"
"Dirty Women"
"Embryo"/"Children of the Grave"
Encore
"Paranoid"

Tour dates

Gross
The tour grossed $84.8 million, with 1,074,495 tickets sold from 74 shows.

Personnel
Ozzy Osbourne – lead vocals
Tony Iommi – lead guitar
Geezer Butler – bass guitar
Additional musicians
Tommy Clufetos – drums and percussion
Adam Wakeman – keyboards and rhythm guitar

References

External links
 Official Black Sabbath site
 Black Sabbath on Facebook
 Black Sabbath on Twitter

2016 concert tours
2017 concert tours
Black Sabbath concert tours
Farewell concert tours